Nedzhirlu may refer to:
Nerkin Nedzhirlu, Armenia
Verin Nedzhirlu, Armenia